The 1925 Philadelphia Phillies season was a season in Major League Baseball. The Phillies finished seventh in the National League with a record of 68 wins and 85 losses.

Offseason 
The Phillies trained in Bradenton, Florida in 1925. Shortly after beginning camp, catcher Butch Henline was named team captain.

Regular season

Season standings

Record vs. opponents

Roster

Player stats

Batting

Starters by position 
Note: Pos = Position; G = Games played; AB = At bats; H = Hits; Avg. = Batting average; HR = Home runs; RBI = Runs batted in

Other batters 
Note: G = Games played; AB = At bats; H = Hits; Avg. = Batting average; HR = Home runs; RBI = Runs batted in

Pitching

Starting pitchers 
Note: G = Games pitched; IP = Innings pitched; W = Wins; L = Losses; ERA = Earned run average; SO = Strikeouts

Other pitchers 
Note: G = Games pitched; IP = Innings pitched; W = Wins; L = Losses; ERA = Earned run average; SO = Strikeouts

Relief pitchers 
Note: G = Games pitched; W = Wins; L = Losses; SV = Saves; ERA = Earned run average; SO = Strikeouts

Notes

External links
1925 Philadelphia Phillies season at Baseball Reference

Philadelphia Phillies seasons
Philadelphia Phillies season
Philly